There are two Courts of Appeal in the U.S. state of Oklahoma:

 Oklahoma Court of Civil Appeals hears appeals in civil cases. Decisions from this court may be further appealed to the Oklahoma Supreme Court.
 Oklahoma Court of Criminal Appeals hears appeals in criminal cases. This is the highest court for criminal cases in Oklahoma; decisions from this court can only be appealed to the Supreme Court of the United States.

References

Oklahoma state courts